The 2007 Nigerian Senate election in Niger State was held on 21 April 2007, to elect members of the Nigerian Senate to represent Niger State. Dahiru Awaisu Kuta representing Niger East, Zainab Abdulkadir Kure representing Niger South and Nuhu Aliyu Labbo representing Niger North all won on the platform of the People's Democratic Party.

Overview

Summary

Results

Niger East 
The election was won by Dahiru Awaisu Kuta of the Peoples Democratic Party (Nigeria).

Niger South 
The election was won by Zainab Abdulkadir Kure of the Peoples Democratic Party (Nigeria).

Niger North
The election was won by Nuhu Aliyu Labbo of the Peoples Democratic Party (Nigeria).

References 

April 2007 events in Nigeria
Niger State Senate elections
Nigerian Senate elections